Richard Leach (born in Bangor, Maine in 1953) is an American hymn writer and poet.

He received a B.A from Bowdoin College in 1974, and an M.Div. from Princeton Theological Seminary in 1978. He was a United Church of Christ pastor in Connecticut from 1978 to 1999. He began writing hymns in 1987. In 1999 he left the ministry of the United Church of Christ and became a member of the Evangelical Lutheran Church in America. He is a member of The Hymn Society in the United States and Canada.

Published works 
 Tuned for Your Sake, Selah Publishing Co., 2007 
 New Harmony, A Harp of Thousand Strings (with David Ashley White), Selah Publishing Co., 2006
 Come and Hear the Blessing, Hymns on the Beatitudes (with Amanda Husberg), Abingdon Press, 2006
 Honey from the Rock (with various composers), Selah Publishing Co., 2005
 We Sing the Shoreline (with various composers), Selah Publishing Co., 2004
 Pray Then Like This, A Hymn Cycle on the Lord’s Prayer (with Carson Cooman), Selah Publishing Co., 2002
 Go Worship at Emmanuel’s Feet, Selah Publishing Co., 2001
 Memory, Take the Hand of Hope, Selah Publishing Co., 2000
 Carpenter, Why Leave the Bench, Selah Publishing Co., 1996
 Over the Waves of Words (with various composers), Selah Publishing Co., 1996
 Feel the Spirit in the Kicking, Selah Publishing Co., 1995

Notes

References 
 Prism, A Theological Forum for the United Church of Christ, vol. 22, no. 1, Spring 2008, United Church Press. 
 Routley, Erik; Paul Richardson (ed.), 2005. A Panorama of Christian Hymnody, GIA Publications, Inc.

External links 
 Biography

1953 births
Living people
American male poets
Princeton Theological Seminary alumni
United Church of Christ ministers
American Lutherans
Writers from Bangor, Maine
American Lutheran hymnwriters
20th-century American poets
20th-century American male writers